Hydrophilomyces is a genus of fungi in the family Laboulbeniaceae. It was circumscribed by American mycologist Roland Thaxter in 1908. The genus contain 12 species.

Species
Hydrophilomyces aduncus
Hydrophilomyces arcuatus
Hydrophilomyces atroseptatus
Hydrophilomyces coelostomalis
Hydrophilomyces coneglianensis
Hydrophilomyces gracilis
Hydrophilomyces hamatus
Hydrophilomyces limnebii
Hydrophilomyces lumbricoides
Hydrophilomyces pusillus
Hydrophilomyces rhynchophorus
Hydrophilomyces rhytidopus

References

Laboulbeniaceae
Laboulbeniales genera